Poch or Pöch may refer to:

Amparo Poch y Gascón, (1902-1968) Spanish anarchist, doctor, and activist in the years leading up to and during the Spanish Civil War
Carles Poch-Gradin (born 1982), Spanish professional tennis player
Chea Poch, Cambodian politician
Mauricio Pochettino, Argentinian former footballer and manager of Tottenham Hotspur
Poch Juinio, former Filipino Professional basketball player of the Philippine Basketball Association
Rudolf Pöch (1870–1921), Austrian doctor, anthropologist, and ethnologist
Terri Poch (born 1967), American bodybuilder and former professional wrestler

See also
Poch'%C5%8Fn, kun, or county, in Ryanggang province, North Korea

Catalan-language surnames